Billy's Adventure is a single-reel American silent comedy film released in 1913. It was one of the last in a series of films made by actors Billy Quirk and Violet Horner for the Gem Motion Picture Company.

Plot
The titular character disguises himself as a pupil at a girls' boarding school, and later a prince, to win his future father-in-law's approval.

Release
Billy's Adventure was released on May 13, 1913 in the United States, and in England on September 8, 1913.

References

External links
 

1913 films
1913 comedy films
Silent American comedy films
American black-and-white films
American silent short films
1910s American films